Faujdarhat Collegiate School is situated on Faujdarhat Cadet College campus in Faujdarhat, Sitakunda Upazila of Chittagong District, Bangladesh. This school was mainly established for the cadet college staff children. It has about 600 students. The EIIN number of this institution is 105074. The ex-students of this institution celebrated two reunions. One was in 2008 and another one was on 13 January 2017.

Extra-curriculum activities 
The school occurs annual cultural function, annual sports competition and the reward giving ceremony every year. Generally, the rewards are given by invited guest like Principal of Faujdarhat Cadet College or the MP of Sitakunda Upazila.

Gallery

References

High schools in Bangladesh
Educational institutions established in 1982
1982 establishments in Bangladesh
Schools in Chittagong District